Odostomia bachia is a species of sea snail, a marine gastropod mollusc in the family Pyramidellidae, the pyrams and their allies.

Distribution
This species occurs in the Pacific Ocean off California.

References

External links
 To World Register of Marine Species

bachia
Gastropods described in 1927